William Hall Deering (July 21, 1886August 10, 1957) was an American politician, businessperson, and civil servant from Maine.

He was the son of Gilman N. and Miriam Hall Deering. A graduate of Worcester Academy and Dartmouth College (1910). After graduating from Dartmouth, he began working in the meatpacking business with his father at Swift and Company in Saco. He served in the United States military during World War I. From 1925 to 1929, he served two terms in the Maine House of Representatives as a Republican.

Moving to Augusta, Maine in 1930, he eventually became business manager and treasurer of the Augusta State Hospital in 1935.

He died in 1957 at the age of 71 and is buried in a family plot at Laurel Hill Cemetery in Saco.

References

1886 births
1957 deaths
People from Saco, Maine
Republican Party members of the Maine House of Representatives
Worcester Academy alumni
Dartmouth College alumni
American military personnel of World War I